Nienke Timmer (born 10 February 1998) is a Dutch Paralympic athlete with cerebral palsy. She competes in 100 and 200 metres sprinting events for T35-classified athletes. She won the bronze medal in the women's 100 metres T35 event at the 2019 World Para Athletics Championships held in Dubai, United Arab Emirates. She is also a three-time silver medalist at the World Para Athletics European Championships.

Career 

In 2014, she finished in 4th place in both the women's 100 metres T35 and women's 200 metres T35 events at the IPC Athletics European Championships held in Swansea, United Kingdom. In 2015, she competed in the women's 100 metres T35 and women's 200 metres T35 events at the 2015 IPC Athletics World Championships held in Doha, Qatar. In 2018, she won the silver medal in both the women's 100 metres T35 and women's 200 metres T35 events at the World Para Athletics European Championships held in Berlin, Germany.

In 2019, she won the bronze medal in the women's 100 metres T35 event at the World Para Athletics Championships held in Dubai, United Arab Emirates. In 2021, she won the silver medal in the women's 100 metres T35 event at the World Para Athletics European Championships held in Bydgoszcz, Poland.

She represented the Netherlands at the 2020 Summer Paralympics in Tokyo, Japan. She competed in the women's 100 metres T35 and women's 200 metres T35 events.

Achievements

References

External links 
 

Living people
1998 births
Place of birth missing (living people)
Dutch female sprinters
Medalists at the World Para Athletics Championships
Medalists at the World Para Athletics European Championships
Female competitors in athletics with disabilities
Track and field athletes with cerebral palsy
Athletes (track and field) at the 2020 Summer Paralympics
Paralympic athletes of the Netherlands
20th-century Dutch women
21st-century Dutch women